Meerzorg Stadion is a multi-purpose stadium in Meerzorg, Suriname. It is home to both SVB Hoofdklasse clubs SV Excelsior and SV Nishan 42. The stadium has a capacity of 1,300 people

Location
The Meerzorg Stadium is located along the Oost-Westverbinding in the Southeast part of Meerzorg, Commewijne District across the Suriname river from the capital city Paramaribo.

References

Football venues in Suriname
S.V. Excelsior